Samuel Temidayo Feargod Akinbinu (born 6 June 1999) is a footballer who plays as a forward for Djibouti Premier League club Arta/Solar7 and the Djibouti national team.

Born in Nigeria, Akinbinu represents Djibouti internationally.

Club career
On 10 January 2018, Akinbinu signed for Nigeria Professional Football League club Rivers United. On 19 April 2018, in the mid-season transfer windows, Akinbinu signed for Lobi Stars.

On 2 July 2019, Akinbinu joined Djibouti Premier League champions Arta/Solar7.

International career
Akinbinu received his Djiboutian citizenship in June 2021.

Akinbinu debuted on 15 June 2021, in a friendly match against Somalia, scoring his first goal in a 1–0 victory at the Stade du Ville.

International goals

Honours
Arta/Solar7
 Djibouti Premier League: 2020–2021, 2021–2022
 Djibouti Cup: 2019–2020, 2020–2021, 2021–2022
 Djibouti Super Cup: 2020, 2022

References

External links
 
  
  

 
1999 births
Living people
Sportspeople from Lagos
Djiboutian footballers
Djibouti international footballers
Nigerian footballers
Djiboutian people of Nigerian descent
Naturalized citizens of Djibouti
Nigerian emigrants to Djibouti
Association football forwards
Shooting Stars S.C. players
First Bank F.C. players
Bayelsa United F.C. players
Rivers United F.C. players
Lobi Stars F.C. players
AS Arta/Solar7 players
Nigeria Professional Football League players
Djibouti Premier League players